Kalabaaz is a 1977 Bollywood film directed by Ashok Roy.

Plot
Trapeze artistes, Vijay (Dev Anand) and Radha (Zeenat Aman), also known as Lisa, love each other. Radha's father G.D. Sapru (Pradeep Kumar) manages the circus in which they work. In a daredevil act without any safety net support, Radha misses Vijay, falls down to ground and is hospitalized with serious wounds. Her face is totally disfigured after recovery. She decides to move abroad, not willing to show her disfigured face to Vijay. Meanwhile, a group of Hindu priests ask Vijay to locate for them statues of Shri Krishna and Devi Radha in the mountainous region bordering India and Burma. Vijay agrees to do so and sets out on the mission with Mangu (Tarun Ghosh), Changu (Asrani) and Sandoz (Hercules). On their way, they meet G. D. Sapru with his niece Tina (Zeenat Aman), Radha's look alike and also the dying Poojary (A. K. Hangal). Whether Vijay is successful in getting the statues and identifying Tina as Radha forms the rest of the story

Cast

Dev Anand as Vijay
Zeenat Aman as Lisa/Radha G. Sapru/Tina
Pradeep Kumar as G. D. Sapru, Circus owner
Asrani as Changu
Tarun Ghosh as Mangu
Hercules as Sandoz
A. K. Hangal as Poojary
Dev Kumar as King Mong
Sujit Kumar as Malhotra
Mohan Sherry
Lalita Kumari as Tara
Ambika Johar - Special Appearance
 Mohammad ali    - Special Appearance

Crew
Director - Ashok Roy
Producer - Yash Kohli
Story - Tarun Ghosh
Screenplay - Kaul Tarun Sen
Dialogue - S. M. Abbas
Editor - Babu Sheikh
Cinematographer - D. K. Prabhakar

Soundtrack

External links
 

1977 films
1970s Hindi-language films
Films scored by Kalyanji Anandji